Ali Jangali is a Somali politician.

Personal life
Jama belongs to the Dhulbahante subclan of the Darod.

Career
Between 2004 and 2012, Jama held various positions in
 
  Transitional Federal Government of Somalia. Among these portfolios were Minister of Foreign Affairs and International Cooperation, as well as Information Minister.

He is the former Minister of Air Transport and Aviation the Federal Government of Somalia, having been appointed to the position on 27 January 2015 by the now former Prime Minister Omar Abdirashid Ali Sharmarke. Currently serving as a member or parliament.

References

Year of birth missing (living people)
Living people
Government ministers of Somalia